Skepsis is the third studio album by American deathcore band Through the Eyes of the Dead. The first album to feature vocalist Danny Rodriguez, drummer Michael Ranne, and the only one to feature guitarist Chris Henckel.

This album leaves most of the band's original deathcore sound found on their debut album behind in favor of expanding their horizons into technical death metal.

Track listing

References

2010 albums
Through the Eyes of the Dead albums
Prosthetic Records albums